Agaribacter  is a bacteria genus from the family of Alteromonadaceae. Up to now there is only one species of this genus known (Agaribacter marinus).

References

Further reading 
 

Alteromonadales
Monotypic bacteria genera
Bacteria genera